Musumeci is a family name of Italian origin. It may refer to: 
 Musumeci, Michael, American Brazilian Jiu jitsu Champion 
 Maddalena Musumeci, Italian water polo player 
 Nello Musumeci, Italian right wing politician and President of Sicily
 Nina Musumeci, American beauty queen
 Pietro Musumeci, Italian general and deputy director of Italy's military intelligence agency
 Tuccio Musumeci, Italian actor and comedian
 

Italian-language surnames